Osamu Naito (born 14 April 1949) is a Japanese speed skater. He competed in two events at the 1972 Winter Olympics.

References

External links
 

1949 births
Living people
Japanese male speed skaters
Olympic speed skaters of Japan
Speed skaters at the 1972 Winter Olympics
Sportspeople from Nagano Prefecture